The 1978 Manly-Warringah Sea Eagles season was the 32nd in the club's history since their entry into the then New South Wales Rugby Football League premiership in 1947.

The 1978 Sea Eagles were coached by 1963–64 Kangaroo tourist Frank Stanton. Captaining the side was long serving hooker Max Krilich. The club competed in the New South Wales Rugby Football League's 1978 Premiership season and played its home games at the 27,000 capacity Brookvale Oval.

Ladder

Regular season

Finals

Major Prelim Semi-Final

Minor Semi-Final

Minor Semi-Final Replay

Preliminary Final

Grand Final

In the Grand Final, Cronulla went to a 9-4 lead in the second half before Manly came back to hit the front 11-9. A Steve Rogers penalty squared it at 11-all but he then missed a desperate late field-goal attempt and at full-time the scores remained locked. For the second consecutive season the weary Grand Finalists were required to play a mid-week rematch three days later (the NSWRFL were forced to play the replay on the Tuesday and not the following weekend due to the upcoming 1978 Kangaroo tour, with the Australian team due to leave that weekend for their tour. The drawn GF also forced the Australian Rugby League to hold off on naming the touring squad until after the GF replay with as many as 12 players from Manly and Cronulla in contention to be selected).

Grand Final Replay

The Tuesday rematch in front of 33,552 was Manly's sixth game in twenty-four days. It was the second Grand Final in a row to end up going into a mid-week replay with the 1977 Grand Final between St George and Parramatta also needing a re-match to decide the Premiers after the original game had been a 9-all draw.

In the first half Cronulla had no answer to Graham Eadie's blind-side bursts. His display completely routed the hapless Sharks and Manly went to the break holding a 15-0 lead thanks to a try by Eadie in the scoreboard corner, one he set up for centre Russel Gartner in the same corner, and another 65 metre effort by Gartner after a sweeping backline movement saw him run into open space and easily outpace the Sharks defence to score in front of the Sheridan Stand.

The only points in the second half came from a field goal by Eadie.

In the replay, as throughout their extraordinary finals campaign, Manly were inspired by the leadership of captain Max Krilich and coach Frank Stanton, their iron-man Terry Randall who had required numerous pain killing injections before every game of the finals just to be able take the field in what Frank Stanton called sheer mind over matter, their cool five eighth Alan Thompson and classy fullback and Man of the Match Graham Eadie.

As of the 2016 NRL Grand Final, no player since Eadie has scored the combination of a try, a goal and a field-goal in a Grand Final.

The refereeing of Greg "Hollywood" Hartley in the replay and throughout the 1978 Finals series attracted criticism from coaches Roy Masters (Western Suburbs), Jack Gibson (South Sydney) and Terry Fearnley (Parramatta), all of whom appealed to the NSWRFL to prohibit Hartley from refereeing their clubs' matches the following season.

Player statistics
Note: Games and (sub) show total games played, e.g. 1 (1) is 2 games played.

Representative Players

International

 Australia – Graham Eadie, Johnny Gibbs, Max Krilich, Steve Martin, Alan Thompson, Ian Thomson, Bruce Walker, Frank Stanton (coach)

State
 New South Wales – Graham Eadie, Johnny Gibbs, Max Krilich, Steve Martin, Terry Randall, Ian Thomson, Frank Stanton (coach)

City vs Country
 City Firsts – Terry Randall, Ian Thomson, Frank Stanton (coach)

References

External links
Manly Warringah Sea Eagles official website
National Rugby League official website

Manly Warringah Sea Eagles seasons
Manly-Warringah Sea Eagles season
Manly-Warringah Sea Eagles season